Titoda Mafi is a village situated in Bhilwara district near Sawar/Pander in Rajasthan.

Villages in Bhilwara district

Charan